Farbrausch, or Farb-rausch, is a German group of demomakers who became well known in the demoscene in December 2000 with a 64k intro called "fr-08: .the .product". The demo achieved its small size through the use of procedural textures, a custom MIDI-based software synthesizer V2 (controlled through a sequencer called Logic Audio), and a modified version of UPX executable compressor, ".the .product" is an 11-minute 3-D show featuring complex scenes of computer generated imagery.

The name "Farbrausch" translates literally to "color rush", where rush means variously "intoxication, drunkenness, high, ecstasy, and state of euphoria.".

Their work has won numerous awards. In 2004, a subdivision of farbrausch called ".theprodukkt" released a 96 kB first-person shooter game named ".kkrieger", and an earlier version of the tool they currently use to produce some of their demos, named ".werkkzeug", or "Tool".

Farbrausch give their releases a "product code", in the format "fr-0#".  The numbers do not specify the order of release — the members have stated that they allocate the numbers as they start working on the project, not when they finish it. Non-serious releases receive negative numbers.

The group has periodically released improved compositions such as "fr-019: Poem to a Horse", "fr-030: Candytron"  or "fr-025: The.Popular.Demo". The.Popular.Demo and debris. are among the most highly favored demos on the demoscene index, Pouet. The.Popular.Demo also received the "Public Choice Award" from the 2003 scene.org awards, and debris. won the 2007 scene.org award for best direction.

In 2009, Farbrausch released .detuned, an interactive demo for the PlayStation 3, again under the name .theprodukkt.

In 2012 Farbrausch released the source code of many of their demo tools on GitHub.com.

Notable demo releases and awards

External links 

 Farbrausch main website
 All Farbrausch demos on pouet.net

Farbrausch technology 

 Farbrausch tool source code (with executables for .werkkzeug4)
 Farbrausch .werkkzeug1 demotool
 A Windows executable for the Farbrausch .werkkzeug3 demotool
 The V2 synthesizer

Information regarding Farbrausch 

 : Features an interview with DOJ of farbrausch who explains the history of "Elitegroup" and of Farbrausch.  (MP3 audio)
 An Interview with the Farbrausch Group (video, in German)
 Making of .the .product

References 

Demogroups